The 48th Fighter Wing (48 FW) is part of the United States Air Force's Third Air Force, assigned to Headquarters Air Command Europe and United States Air Forces in Europe (USAFE).  It is based at RAF Lakenheath, England. The 48 FW is the only F-15 wing based in Europe which hosts two F-15E Strike Eagle squadrons. The wing also hosts two F-35A Lightning II squadrons. The 48 FW was given the name "Statue of Liberty Wing" on 4 July 1954 and remains the only U.S. Air Force unit with both a name and a numerical designation.

The 48 FW operates in support of United States Air Forces in Europe – Air Forces Africa, United States European Command and NATO.

Units
The Liberty Wing has nearly 5,700 active-duty military members, 2,000 British and U.S. civilians, and includes a geographically separated unit at nearby RAF Feltwell. In addition to supporting two squadrons of F-15E Strike Eagle and two squadrons of F-35A Lightning II fighter aircraft.

 48th Operations Group (48 OG)
 Formerly the 48th Fighter-Bomber Group. Provides two squadrons of F-35A, and two squadrons of F-15E aircraft.  The group also has one operations support squadron. The 48 OG prepares its aircrew and support personnel to accomplish USAFE, U.S. European Command and NATO war plans and contingency operations. It also provides equipment, training, scheduling, analysis, weather, intelligence, standardization and evaluation, and command and control for an efficient flying operation.

 48th Maintenance Group (48 MXG)
 Responsible for all organizational and intermediate level maintenance for F-15 C/E aircraft, engines, munitions and support equipment used by all three fighter squadrons to accomplish USAFE, U.S. European Command and NATO commitments and taskings. Ensures readiness for all personnel and aircraft fleet health through planning, analysis and programming for manpower, funds, equipment, training and facility requirements.

 48th Mission Support Group (48 MSG)
 The 48 MSG executes expeditionary and in-garrison personnel, logistics, communications, contracting, engineering and services support for USAFE's only lead Air Expeditionary wing. It also provides force protection for infrastructure, facilities, and personnel at home and deployed locations.

 48th Medical Group (48 MDG)
 The 48 MDG supports the combat capability of the 48th Fighter Wing at RAF Lakenheath and the 100th Air Refueling Wing and 352d Special Operations Wing at nearby RAF Mildenhall by delivering health care to its beneficiaries. The 48 MDG serves as USAFE's premier specialty referral center and its hospital treats 180,000 outpatients and 2,000 inpatients annually at 7 operating locations and maintains an Expeditionary Medical Support (EMEDS) capability.

History
 For additional history and lineage, see 48th Operations Group

.

On 10 July 1952, the Oklahoma Air National Guard 137th Fighter-Bomber Wing at Chaumont-Semoutiers Air Base, France was redesignated the 48th Fighter-Bomber Wing. The fighter squadrons being redesignated the 492d, 493d, and 494th respectively, the 58 F-84Gs and support aircraft of the ANG were assigned to the 48th Fighter-Bomber Group under the Hobson Plan. The 48th FBW commanded the functions of both the support groups as well as the flying combat 48th FBG. The few National Guardsmen still with the wing departed and the last were released from active duty on 9 July, although a few reserve officers remained on active duty for an additional six to twelve months.

With the F-84, the 48 FBW took part in North Atlantic Treaty Organization and United States Air Forces in Europe (USAFE) activities, participating in exercises with the U.S. Seventh Army. In addition, the 48th conducted operational readiness exercises and tactical evaluations. Honing bombing and gunnery skills. The 48th frequently deployed to Wheelus Air Base, Libya for training.

The 48th Wing served the longest in France, from 10 July 1952 through 15 January 1960. The men and women of the 48th worked hard to develop Chaumont-Semoutiers Air Base into one of the best air bases in Europe. Its squadrons remained unchanged while flying three different type of fighters, the F-84G, F-86F and the F-100D, and maintaining the capability to fight either a conventional or nuclear war if need be.

An open house was held once a year, with great numbers of French civilians in attendance. In 1954, over 15,000 attended the Armed Forces Day event to see static aircraft displays, watch flight demonstrations, listen to a French army band and other activities. In just over three years since construction began, Chaumont Air Base became an important part of the Haute-Marne region.

To bolster Franco-American relations, the 48th Wing Staff came up with the idea of changing the wing insignia. Chaumont AB is located not far from the workshops of Frédéric Bartholdi – the French architect who designed the Statue of Liberty. The new design incorporated the Statue of Liberty, and throughout Europe the 48th became known as the "Statue of Liberty" Wing. On 4 July 1954 the mayor of the town of Chaumont bestowed the honorary title of the Statue de la Liberté (Statue of Liberty) Wing upon the 48th. It is the only USAF unit with both an official name and a numerical designation.

Not long after the wing proudly took on the title of The Statue of Liberty Wing, the wing's comptroller discovered the factory that had produced the actual Statue of Liberty was only 25 miles from Chaumont. In fact, one of the actual molds still existed. The factory agreed to cast a three-meter replica of the statue for $1,700. The wing raised the funds by raffling off a 1956 French Ford Versailles sedan. The statue still stands in Chaumont as a memorial to the service of the 48th Fighter-Bomber Wing in France, with a replica located at RAF Lakenheath.

In November 1953, the wing exchanged its F-84Cs for newer North American F-86 Sabre (F models), receiving 75 aircraft, 25 per squadron. Then word came in late 1956 that the Air Force would exchange the wing's Sabres for a newer aircraft: the North American F-100 Super Sabre. The larger-bodied F-100 was capable of carrying more ordnance than the F-86 and was one of the first fighters designed to operate at supersonic speeds. 90 single-seat F-100D aircraft were received, along with 13 F-100F dual-seaters.

The wing began realigning its units 15 March 1957, as part of an Air Force worldwide reorganization. The 48th Fighter-Bomber Group was inactivated on 8 December 1957 when its component squadrons were assigned directly to the 48th FBW as the Air Force reorganized its wings into the tri-deputate system.

As part of yet another organization change, the 48th dropped the "Fighter Bomber" designation 8 July 1958, becoming the 48th Tactical Fighter Wing. The three flying units also changed designation, becoming tactical fighter squadrons.

Despite the close relationship between the wing and the people of Chaumont, international relationships between France and the US deteriorated in the late 1950s, resulting in French President Charles de Gaulle demanding the removal of NATO forces from the country. Under a project known as "Red Richard", USAFE relocated its units from France to other locations around Europe. Simultaneously, the advent of the inter-continental ballistic missile had reduced the United States' dependence on European-based airborne medium-and long ranged bombers.

On 15 January 1960, the 48 TFW redeployed to an empty Strategic Air Command heavy bomber base, RAF Lakenheath, England. In the early the wing's three fighter squadrons lifted off Chaumont's runway and, after making farewell passes over the outlying village, headed toward the English Channel.

RAF Lakenheath

On 15 January 1960, jet fighters of the 48TFW landed at RAF Lakenheath for the first time. The Royal Air Force used the base during World War II and Strategic Air Command during the Korean War, both flying bomber aircraft. The tactical components of the 48th TFW upon arrival at Lakenheath were:

 492d Tactical Fighter Squadron (LR, blue colors)
 493d Tactical Fighter Squadron (LS, yellow colors)
 494th Tactical Fighter Squadron (LT, red colors)

The squadron markings consisted of alternating stripes across the tailfin in squadron colors, with a shadowed "V" shaped chevron on the nose. Starting in March 1970 squadron tail codes (shown above) were added when the aircraft went from a natural finish to a Southeast Asian camouflage motif.

The wing and its fighters brought a new mission and the first permanent American presence to RAF Lakenheath. The base required a myriad of construction projects to support the mission. Maintenance and flying operations areas required conversions to support fighter operations, and the base needed the creation of a support structure for a permanent host unit.

East Germany's 1961 decision to build the Berlin Wall and the 1962 Cuban Missile Crisis increased Cold War tensions to an all-time high. In response, RAF Lakenheath served as a rotational base for SAC B-47 and B-52 aircraft throughout the Berlin Crisis. Also in 1962, the 48th TFW came under the operational command of Third Air Force.

Between 1963 and 1972 the wing's F-100 fleet maintained its readiness by participating in a number of USAFE and NATO exercises training to react to possible aggression from the Soviet Union. They underwent a series of NATO tactical evaluations, for which they earned the wing their first Air Force Outstanding Unit Award, for the period from 1 July 1961 to 29 February 1964. The wing conducted several deployments to Turkey, Italy, Spain, and across the United Kingdom

On 1 October 1971, the 492d Tactical Fighter Squadron stood down from its NATO commitments, followed by the 493d on 1 December and the 494th on 1 February 1972. The period between 1972 and 1977 can be described as a five-year aircraft conversion. Beginning in late 1971 the 48th TFW started its conversion to the McDonnell Douglas F-4D Phantom II, with the aircraft being transferred from the 81st TFW at RAF Bentwaters. The conversion to the F-4D took several years, with the last F-100 departing in August 1974. With the arrival of the Phantoms, the F-4s adopted a common tail code of "LK". This tail code lasted only a few months as in July and August 1972 the 48th TFW further recoded to "LN". The F-4D carried squadron identifying fin cap colors of blue, yellow and red (492d, 493d, 494th respectively). The squadron conversion dates were:

 492d TFS 1 October 1971 and 31 January 1972
 493d TFS 1 December 1971 and April 1972
 494th TFS 1 February 1972 and 25 July 1974

The F-4's service with the 48th TFW was short as operation "Ready Switch" transferred the F-4D assets to the 474th TFW at Nellis AFB Nevada. The 474th sent their General Dynamics F-111 AardvarkAs to the 366th TFW at Mountain Home AFB Idaho, and the 366th sent their F-111Fs to Lakenheath in early 1977. Unlike the previous F-4 transition, the F-111 change took place quickly and without any significant problems. In fact, the wing received its third Air Force Outstanding Unit Award for such a smooth transition. Almost immediately after changing aircraft, the wing began a series of monthly exercises and deployments that took the Liberty Wing to Italy, Iran, Greece, and Pakistan.

A fourth fighter squadron, the 495th Tactical Fighter Squadron was activated with the 48th TFW on 1 April 1977 with a squadron tail color of green. This was 33 years to the day since the squadron's inactivation. The 495th's mission of functioning as a replacement training unit for the other three fighter squadrons made the 48th TFW unique in two ways. First, it made the 48th the only combat wing in USAFE with four squadrons. Furthermore, it made the 48th the only wing operating with its own replacement training unit. In the same year construction of the airfield's Hardened Aircraft Shelters (acronym: HAS, but commonly referred to as a TAB-VEE) began as part of a wider NATO effort.

By September 1979, the wing had flown the highest number of hours ever recorded in a fiscal year by an F-111 unit. This dedication culminated in the 48th's performance during a joint USAFE Operational Readiness Inspection and NATO Tactical Evaluation in March 1980. As a result, the Secretary of the Air Force selected the 48th TFW for its fourth Air Force Outstanding Unit Award.

In the early 1980s the wing struggled with aircraft shortages. Primarily, this resulted from the upgrade to the Pave Tack, a laser guided weapons delivery system. Each aircraft had to process through the upgrade facility at the Air Logistics Center in California. At the same time, the wing had to deal with supply shortages resulting from years of reduced military budgets in the late 1970s.

Operation El Dorado Canyon

By the mid-1980s the "Red Scare" was not the only American fear for national security; terrorists struck targets from bombing of US Marines in Beirut to Berlin, from Rome to Rotterdam. Some of these attacks were attributed to the Libyan government headed by Colonel Muammar Gaddafi. In retaliation, U.S. President Ronald Reagan ordered a strike against targets in Tripoli, which were carried out by the United States Navy Sixth Fleet and F-111s of the 48th Tactical Fighter Wing. The F-111Fs from Lakenheath were chosen for their capability to fly long distances and deliver laser-guided munitions with great accuracy.

At approximately 19:00 the evening of 14 April 1986, 24 F-111Fs departed Lakenheath's runway, six of which were airborne spares in the event malfunctions forced any of the primary aircraft to abort. In flights of four, aircrews flew south through the Straits of Gibraltar and began their orchestrated attack shortly after midnight on 15 April. They were targeted on Azziziyah Barracks, the Sidi Balal terrorist training camp, and Tripoli Airport. With the sky lit up from Tripoli's city lights, anti-aircraft tracers, and brilliant surface-to-air missile detonations, determined 48th TFW crews unleashed 60 tons of munitions, damaging their targets. In spite of the mission's success, the Wing experienced a major loss. As the strike force recovered at Lakenheath, both air and ground crews were given the somber news that Major Fernando Ribas (Utuado, Puerto Rico) pilot, and Weapons System Operator Captain Paul Lorence, were missing.

The grueling 14-hour flight took its toll. "Those guys were so fatigued, the crew chiefs literally had to pull some of the crews out of the cockpits", recalled CMSgt Richard O’Shaughnessy, then a Master Sergeant and weapons flight supervisor. "Most of them actually lost several pounds from sweating so much. When the guys pulled their helmets off, sweat literally poured down their foreheads and necks".

On 8 September 1986, US Navy Secretary John Lehman personally presented the Navy's Meritorious Unit Commendation to the 48th TFW for its participation in the operation. The 48th TFW is the only Air Force unit to have received this prestigious award. Likewise, General Charles L. Donnelly, Jr., Commander-in-Chief, USAFE, visited RAF Lakenheath on 17 February 1987 and presented decorations to those who participated in the operation. The ceremony ended with a presentation to Captain Lorence's widow Diane, followed by a missing man flyover.

To the Middle East, 1990–91
In response to the Iraqi invasion of Kuwait on 2 August 1990, during the first week of August, Col Thomas J. Lennon, 48th Tactical Fighter Wing Commander, received a call from Headquarters, US States Air Force, asking if the 48th Tactical Fighter Wing was ready to deploy. Colonel Lennon built a team of 13 members from wing leadership, known as the "Lucky 13", and preparations began for the eventual movement of personnel and F-111s to Saudi Arabia.

On 25 August 1990, 18 F-111s took off from Lakenheath as the first USAFE unit to deploy. In this first group, nearly 500 men and women of the Liberty Wing departed. The 48th TFW deployed more than 60 aircraft and 1,500 personnel to Taif Air Base, Saudi Arabia. The 492d, 493d and 494th TFSs deployed, supplying 66 F-111Fs, which were in place by December 1990.  Some aircrew & other members of the 495th TFS were deployed & dispersed throughout its 3 sister squadrons.

During the Operation Desert Storm air war 17 January-24 February 1991, and subsequent four-day ground war of 24–28 February the wing's F-111Fs flew thousands of sorties, unleashing precision-guided and unguided munitions on Iraqi armor, artillery, bridges, military airfields and command and control centers. The wing's crews even stopped the flow of oil contaminating the Persian Gulf by bombing a pumping installation purposefully damaged by retreating Iraqi forces.

Overall, the 48th TFW flew a total of 1919 combat sorties, totaling 2203 target hits. The Wing returned to RAF Lakenheath 13 May 1991.

Post Cold War era

Incorporating the lessons learned during the desert operations, the Air Force directed changes that led to the Objective Wing Organization. Beginning in mid-1991, the 48th Tactical Fighter Wing began restructuring under this program, realigning its maintenance-fighter squadron workforce and establishing several command positions to include the 48th Logistics Group, 48th Medical Group, 48th Support Group, and 48th Operations Group (originally designated the 48th Fighter Group).

The program also redesignated many of the Air Force's units by dropping the "Tactical" from their names. Thus on 1 October 1991, the 48th Tactical Fighter Wing was redesignated the 48th Fighter Wing, and the 492d, 493d, 494th and 495th became simply Fighter Squadrons. The 495th FS inactivated on 13 December 1991.

In the midst of the organizational changes, the wing switched aircraft again, exchanging the F-111Fs for the F-15E Strike Eagle. On 21 February 1992, the first F-15E landed at Lakenheath, with the last F-111F departing for units within the US on 16 December 1992. The final F-15E arrived in June 1993 (actually early 2000s), and the wing achieved initial operational capability on 1 October 1993. With this mission change, the 493d Fighter Squadron inactivated on 1 January 1993, only to reactivate again on 1 January 1994. The squadron received its first maintenance trainer F-15C Eagle on 10 January 1994, then its full complement of F-15C & D aircraft by 22 July 1994. This marked the first time that the 48th had flown a specifically air-to-air weapon system, after flying for more than 50 years with an air-to-ground mission.

Since September 2001, in response to the terrorist attacks in the United States on 11 September 2001, various units of the 48th FW have deployed to Afghanistan to support Operation Enduring Freedom and to Iraq to support Operations Iraqi Freedom and New Dawn, and also to various other US allies such as South Korea.

The wing participated in Operation Odyssey Dawn in Libya in March 2011. One of the wing's F-15E aircraft crashed in Libya after an unapproved flight maneuver on 21 March 2011, but both crew members survived with minor injuries.

An F-15C Eagle from the 48th Fighter Wing crashed into the North Sea on 15 June 2020, killing the pilot on-board. 

On 1 October 2021, the 495th Fighter Squadron was reactivated as the 48th Fighter Wing's first F-35A unit.

In 2021, the 48th Fighter Wing became the first unit outside of the contiguous United States to operate the Lockheed Martin F-35A Lightning II, with two squadrons based at RAF Lakenheath.

Lineage, assignments, components, bases, and aircraft

Lineage
 Established as 48th Fighter-Bomber Wing on 25 June 1952
 Activated on 10 July 1952
 Redesignated: 48th Tactical Fighter Wing on 8 July 1958
 Redesignated: 48th Fighter Wing on 1 October 1991

Assignments

 Twelfth Air Force, 10 July 1952
 United States Air Forces in Europe, 1 January 1958
 Third Air Force, 1 October 1959
 United States Air Forces in Europe, 12 October 1959
 Seventeenth Air Force, 15 November 1959

 Third Air Force, 15 January 1960
 Seventeenth Air Force, 1 July 1961
 Third Air Force, 1 September 1963
 United States Air Forces in Europe, 1 November 2005
 Third Air Force, 1 December 2006–

Components
Groups
 48th Fighter-Bomber (later, 48th Operations) Group: 10 July 1952 – 8 December 1957; 31 March 1992–

Squadrons
 492d Fighter-Bomber (later, 492d Tactical Fighter, 492d Fighter) Squadron: attached 15 March – 7 December 1957, assigned 8 December 1957 – 31 March 1992 (detached 20 November 1990 – 10 May 1991; December 1991 – March 1992)
 493d Fighter-Bomber (later, 493d Tactical Fighter, 493d Fighter) Squadron: attached 15 March – 7 December 1957, assigned 8 December 1957 – 18 December 1992 (detached 25 August 1990 – 11 March 1991; March– June 1992)
 494th Fighter-Bomber (later, 494th Tactical Fighter, 494th Fighter) Squadron: attached 15 March – 7 December 1957, assigned 8 December 1957 – 31 March 1992 (detached 2 September 1990 – 15 March 1991; September– December 1991)
 495th Tactical Fighter Squadron: 1 April 1977 – 13 December 1991
 509th Fighter-Bomber Squadron: attached 5 October 1957 – 15 January 1958.

Bases assigned
 Chaumont-Semoutiers Air Base, France, 10 July 1952 – 15 January 1960
 RAF Lakenheath, England, since 15 January 1960

Aircraft

 Republic F-84G Thunderjet
 North American F-86F Sabre
 North American F-100D Super Sabre
 McDonnell-Douglas F-4D Phantom II

 General Dynamics F-111F Aardvark
 McDonnell Douglas F-15C/D Eagle
 McDonnell Douglas F-15E Strike Eagle
 Lockheed Martin F-35A Lightning II (From December 2021)

References

 This article includes content from United States Air Forces In Europe website, which as a work of the U.S. Government is presumed to be a public domain resource. That information was supplemented by:
 Endicott, Judy G. (1999) Active Air Force wings as of 1 October 1995; USAF active flying, space, and missile squadrons as of 1 October 1995. Maxwell AFB, Alabama: Office of Air Force History. CD-ROM.
 Fletcher, Harry R. (1989) Air Force Bases Volume II, Active Air Force Bases outside the United States of America on 17 September 1982. Maxwell AFB, Alabama: Office of Air Force History. 
 McAuliffe, Jerome J (2005) U.S. Air Force in France 1950–1967, Chapter 9, Chaumont-Semoutiers Air Base.
 Ravenstein, Charles A. (1984). Air Force Combat Wings Lineage and Honors Histories 1947–1977. Maxwell AFB, Alabama: Office of Air Force History. .
 Rogers, Brian (2005). United States Air Force Unit Designations Since 1978. Hinkley, England: Midland Publications. .

External links
48th Fighter Wing & RAF Lakenheath Official Site: http://www.lakenheath.af.mil/
Information on the 48th FW @ GlobalSecurity.org 

0048
Military units and formations established in 1991
1991 establishments in the United States